U bar (majuscule: Ʉ, minuscule: ʉ) is a letter of the Latin alphabet, formed from U with the addition of a bar.

In the International Phonetic Alphabet, the lowercase  is used to represent a close central rounded vowel.

Languages that use U bar
Catío Emberá
Comanche
Kanakanavu
Kʼicheʼ
Koyukon
Saaroa
Tsou
Yemba
Ngiemboon

Computer encoding

See also
D with stroke
Ɨ ɨ

Latin letters with diacritics
Phonetic transcription symbols
Vowel letters